John McKay is an English songwriter and guitarist. He was the first studio guitarist of Siouxsie and the Banshees. He was a member of the group from July 1977 until September 1979. He played a "jagged unorthodox chording", and created a "metal-shard roar" with his guitar. Q magazine included McKay's work on "Hong Kong Garden" in its list of the "100 Greatest Guitar Tracks Ever". He recorded two studio albums with the band, their debut album The Scream in 1978  and the sophomore album Join Hands in 1979. 

McKay has been cited as an influence by guitarists such as Geordie Walker of Killing Joke, Robert Smith of the Cure, the Edge of U2, Steve Albini of Big Black, Thurston Moore of Sonic Youth, Johnny Marr of the Smiths, Jim Reid of the Jesus and Mary Chain, Kevin Shields of My Bloody Valentine and Boz Boorer. Record producer Steve Lillywhite stated that McKay was the innovator.

Siouxsie and the Banshees (1977–1979)
McKay grew up in Hemel Hempstead. On 2 July 1977, he joined the band Siouxsie and the Banshees, replacing guitarist Peter Fenton. McKay played his first concert with the band on 9 July at London's Vortex club. His first studio recording with the band was a session for John Peel on BBC radio in November 1977. McKay composed the tune of their first hit single, 1978's "Hong Kong Garden", as well as much of the material found on the band's first two albums, 1978's The Scream and 1979's Join Hands. He is a self-taught musician. Music historian Nick Kent wrote that McKay had "a bent for more adventurous guitar styles involving minor/diminished seventh chord work". Journalist Scott Calhoun wrote that "McKay made use of harmonics as means of artistic expression as well as way of creating textures related to new approaches in the use of the electric guitar". On certain tracks on The Scream such as "Jigsaw Feeling", he had a bell-like sound quality. He used two-note chords on several songs of Join Hands. McKay also played saxophone on the songs "Suburban Relapse", "Switch", "Regal Zone", "Playground Twist" and "Pulled to Bits". He left the band at the beginning of the Join Hands tour, a few hours before a concert in Aberdeen at the Capitol on 7 September 1979. He and drummer Kenny Morris chose to flee the town after having a dispute with Siouxsie and manager Nils Stevenson during a signing session at the Other Record Shop on Union Street.

He later led a trio named Zor Gabor, which released a three-track 12" EP Tightrope in 1987 on the In Tape label. It was reviewed "record of the week" by Sounds.

In December 2022, it was announced that McKay was doing an event in Leeds in April 2023, titled "An Evening with John McKay of Siouxsie and the Banshees 77-79" (i﻿n conversation and demonstrating the "metal-shard roar" guitar sound). It will occur on Sunday 2 April 2023.

Guitars and effects
McKay used different audio effects, including fuzz (to create distortion) and flanger. Peer John Valentine Carruthers said that McKay "had no conventional skill in guitar playing, like chords or lines. He must have had hands like a gorilla because he was playing chords like this (stretches hand right out). I've no idea what they were, and you couldn't tell by listening because they were going through fuzz and flangers." His guitars were a Hagström Semi Acoustic and a Gibson Les Paul. Mckay's effects included Fender Twin Reverb and MXR Flanger. He played metallic guitar.

Legacy
He has influenced several post-punk, noise, indie and alternative rock guitarists including Geordie Walker, Robert Smith, the Edge, John McGeoch, Steve Albini, Thurston Moore, Jim Reid, Kevin Shields,  Johnny Marr and Boz Boorer.

Geordie Walker of Killing Joke said: "The guy's been ripped off so much, he started that flanged chord thing". Walker hailed McKay for his style on The Scream: "he came out with these chord structures that I found very refreshing". When asked "how did playing with the Banshees impact your guitar style" after the  1979's Join Hands tour, Robert Smith of the Cure stated: "It allowed me to experiment. I inherited an approach from John [McKay] which was just to have everything full up, really", using "phased/flanged distortion". Smith aspired to be like the Banshees: "the great thing about the Banshees was that they had this great wall of noise, which I'd never heard before." In an article published in Matter magazine in 1984, Steve Albini of Big Black wrote an "all-time non-comprehensive good guitar list", and included McKay in the section titled "Noise" saying : "The Scream is notable for a couple of things: only now people are trying to copy it, and even now nobody understands how that guitar player got all that pointless noise to stick together as songs". Thurston Moore of Sonic Youth cited "Hong Kong Garden" as one of his 25 all-time favourite songs. Jim Reid of the Jesus and Mary Chain praised The Scream - era, and Kevin Shields of My Bloody Valentine cited the Banshees-MkI as one of his early influences, and he "saw the Banshees in Ireland in 1979". McKay is also revered by other musicians such as Johnny Marr of the Smiths and Boz Boorer (Morrissey's guitarist and composer). When asked "who do you regret not going to see live", Marr replied "Siouxsie and the Banshees mk 1". Marr cites  McKay as one of the guitar players he admires. He considered Mckay as somebody "progressive". Boorer named him as a "big influence on my playing...That first Siouxsie record was quite incredible sounding, and it started me in thinking that music didn’t have to be any certain way—that there could be many different influences in music and it didn’t have to be a single, strict avenue. That first Banshees album has a lot of jarring guitar that rubs against what you’d think was going to or maybe should happen over a part".

In a live review published in 1979, music historian Jon Savage likened Joy Division's guitarist Bernard Sumner to McKay, saying that Sumner "was using a lot of distortion and noise in quite a melodic way. The only other person I could think of who was doing that then was John McKay from Siouxsie and the Banshees". Joy Division's bassist Peter Hook said about the Banshees' debut album: "the way the guitarist...played was a really unusual way of playing". The Edge cited Siouxsie and the Banshees Mk1 of 1977-1978 among the bands who inspired him for U2's early albums. Producer Steve Lillywhite who recorded The Scream and U2's debut album explained to journalist John Robb:  "in terms of the guitar playing...John McKay came before all these people". "He was the innovator".  He added: "You listen to the beginning of Jigsaw Feeling and it's like the beginning of 'I Will Follow'...almost identical". John McGeoch said that hearing "Hong Kong Garden" was one of "the most momentous moments in my life". Bobby Gillespie described McKay's sound as "quicksilver notes of beautiful sonic violence", adding that he "reinvented rock guitar playing". When journalist Simon Reynolds interviewed Lydia Lunch saying there was this starkness of sound on certain Teenage Jesus and the Jerks songs that reminded him Siouxsie and the Banshees' circa The Scream, she replied "I loved the guitar work on their records". John Frusciante considered that what the original Banshees line-up did, was a big step: "you see certain chord shapes that John McKay was doing which hadn't been done" before. When analyzing the band's career, Frusciante noted that McKay "definitely created the framework".

References

External link
 Zor Gabor - official channel on YouTube

English male guitarists
Living people
Siouxsie and the Banshees members
Place of birth missing (living people)
British post-punk musicians
English rock guitarists
1957 births